Fauquier is an unincorporated place on the east shore of Lower Arrow Lake in the West Kootenay region of southeastern British Columbia.

Name origin
The community that arose in the 1910s was named for Frederick George Fauquier, who had served at times as a mining recorder, police officer, notary public, justice of the peace, government agent, stipendiary magistrate, and gold commissioner in the Kootenay region. Sentenced to two years for misappropriating public funds, he had settled at his ranch by 1905, which became known as Fauquier's Landing, or Fauquier.

Former settlement
Fauquier developed one of the largest orchards on the lake, which led to the establishment of other orchards in the neighbourhood. The Canadian Pacific Railway steamers on the Arrowhead–Robson route served the landing. In the early 1930s, the post office and school served the 100 residents.

New settlement
The original Fauquier townsite was submerged when the reservoir for the Keenleyside Dam flooded the area in 1968. The ferry terminals on both sides of the lake were rebuilt at the time. Relocated to higher ground, the settlement was initially called New Fauquier, but the New was soon dropped. The Tukaluk Campground accommodates visitors. The general store/gas bar/liquor outlet, and 9-hole Fauquier & District Golf Course, serve both visitors and residents.

Climate

See also
Fauquier County, Virginia, a county in Virginia, United States of America.

References 

Designated places in British Columbia
Settlements in British Columbia
Arrow Lakes
British Columbia populated places on the Columbia River
Populated places in the West Kootenay